Tiyu Xilu Station is an interchange station on Line 1 and Line 3 of the Guangzhou Metro. It started operations on 28June 1999 (for Line 1) and 26December 2005 (for Line 3). It is situated under Tiyu Road West and Tianhe 1st South Road in the Tianhe District of Guangzhou. It is near Teemall and Guangzhou Books Center, which makes it one of the busiest metro stations in Guangzhou.

The platforms for Line 1 are in the standard island platform layout whilst on Line 3 there are two island platforms serving three tracks. Northbound services to Tianhe Coach Terminal and southbound services to Panyu Square use the outer tracks whilst the train service to the airport uses the single centre track. The doors open on both sides of the centre track to allow cross-platform interchange in both directions.

The station was designated as busiest in the country by a fair margin with 1,252,064 passengers per day in 2017.

Station layout

Exits

References

Railway stations in China opened in 1999
Guangzhou Metro stations in Tianhe District